Differential algebraic geometry is an area of differential algebra that adapts concepts and methods from algebraic geometry and applies them to systems of differential equations, especially algebraic differential equations.

Another way of generalizing ideas from algebraic geometry is diffiety theory.

References
Differential algebraic geometry (three parts in one pdf), part of the Kolchin Seminar in Differential Algebra
, Henri Gillet (2000), Differential algebra - A Scheme Theory Approach, Differential algebra and related topics: proceedings of the International Workshop, Newark Campus of Rutgers, The State University of New Jersey, 2-3 November 2000, Editors	Li Guo, William F. Keigher, World Scientific, 

Differential algebra